An Internet Routing Registry (IRR) is a database of Internet route objects for determining, and sharing route and related information used for configuring routers, with a view to avoiding problematic issues between Internet service providers.

The Internet routing registry works by providing an interlinked hierarchy of objects designed to facilitate the organization of IP routing between organizations, and also to provide data in an appropriate format for automatic programming of routers. Network engineers from participating organizations are authorized to modify the Routing Policy Specification Language (RPSL) objects, in the registry, for their own networks. Then, any network engineer, or member of the public, is able to query the route registry for particular information of interest.

Relevant objects
 AUT-NUM
 INETNUM6
 ROUTE
 INETNUM
 ROUTE6
 AS-SET

Status of implementation
In some RIR regions, the adoption/updates of for e.g. AUT-NUM (Represents for e.g. Autonomous system (Internet)) is only done when the record is created by the RIR, and as long nobody complains about issues, the records remain unreliable/original-state. Most global ASNs provide valid information about their resources in their e.g. AS-SET objects. Peering networks are highly automated, and it would be very harmful for the ASNs.

See also 
 Resource Public Key Infrastructure
 Autonomous system (Internet)

References

 Representation of IP Routing Policies in a Routing Registry (ripe-81++)
 Internet Routing Registry Tutorial

External links
 RFC 2622, Routing Policy Specification Language
 RFC 2650, Using RPSL in Practice
 IRR LIST, A list of routing registries with links to databases and general information
 IRR accuracy, BGPmon.net - How accurate are the Internet Route Registries (IRR)

Internet architecture
Routing